Rockefeller State Park Preserve is a state park in Mount Pleasant, New York in the eastern foothills of the Hudson River in Westchester County. Common activities in the park include horse-riding, walking, jogging, running, bird-watching, and fishing. The park has a rich history and was donated to the State of New York over time by the Rockefeller family beginning in 1983. A section of the park, the Rockwood Hall property, fronts the Hudson River. It was formerly the private residence of William Rockefeller, and began use as a New York state park in the early 1970s. In 2018, the park was added to New York's State Register of Historic Places.

Features
Rockefeller State Park Preserve is designated by the National Audubon Society as an Important Bird Area with over 180 species, and is known for its wildlife, carriage trails, and scenic vistas. The park's  of carriage roads allow visitors to view the various habitats of the  park, which include open meadows, dense forest, meandering brooks, wetlands, and the  Swan Lake.

Rockefeller State Park Preserve abuts the Old Croton Aqueduct State Historic Park and Sleepy Hollow Cemetery. The preserve also abuts extensive private land owned by the Rockefeller family which is open to the public. The trails in the private area, still in use by the Rockefeller family and also open to the public, connect with those in the state park.  Many of these trails were planned and laid out by John D. Rockefeller (Sr.) and his descendants. Access to these trails, and additional access to the state park trails, is available from Sleepy Hollow Road and Bedford Road/Route 448 in Sleepy Hollow. A section of the State Park is west of the Preserve, along the Hudson River, and is called the Rockwood Hall section.

The Visitor Center in the Preserve also has a small art gallery that frequently displays paintings and photographic art works of local artists.

Stone Barns Center for Food & Agriculture, "a nonprofit farm and educational center designed to demonstrate, teach and promote sustainable, community-based food production," is located within walking distance of the preserve. The pigs from Stone Barns often forage in the woods of the preserve. Cattle also graze the preserve's land.

Raven Rock, a large outcrop in the southeaster corner of the Preserve, is mentioned in Washington Irving's The Legend of Sleepy Hollow as being "[haunted by a woman in white who] was often heard to shriek on winter nights before a storm, having perished there in the snow".

The park is open year-round, from sunrise to sunset, with office hours from 9a.m. to 4:30p.m. There is a $6.00 fee for parking.

Rockwood Hall

Rockwood Hall, a section of the state park, was formerly the site of the home of William Rockefeller, brother of John D. Rockefeller. Laurence Rockefeller donated the land to New York in 1999 for use as a park. One of the early owners of the property was Alexander Slidell Mackenzie, who lived there from 1840 to 1848. Edwin Bartlett obtained the property and build Rockwood, an English Gothic castle of locally quarried stone. Bartlett sold the house to his business partner William Henry Aspinwall in 1860; Aspinwall made it his summer home and improved the property and house, and purchased enough land to make his estate . Upon his death in 1875, his son Lloyd Aspinwall lived there until 1886. William Rockefeller then purchased it for $150,000. The resulting 204-room house measured 174 x 104 feet and was the second-largest private house in the U.S. at the time, only behind the Biltmore mansion in Asheville, North Carolina. After sitting vacant for a time, the mansion was torn down in the 1940s.

In 1971 Representative Otis Pike proposed a bill to expropriate historic Gardiners Island, owned by the Gardiner family since 1639, to turn it into a Federal National Monument.  Robert David Lion Gardiner, one of the co-owners, complained that the proposal to expropriate his family's property  was unfair, when the Rockefeller's had been allowed to continue to own the Pocantico Hills.

The land has been used as part of the park since the 1970s, when Laurence Rockefeller leased the estate to New York for use as a park.

In popular culture
The park's entrance on New York State Route 117 and the highway itself were used briefly in the 2002 comedy, Super Troopers.

See also 
 List of New York state parks

References

External links 

 New York State Parks: Rockefeller State Park Preserve
 Friends of the Rockefeller State Park Preserve, Inc.

State parks of New York (state)
Parks in Westchester County, New York
Sleepy Hollow, New York
Pocantico Hills, New York
Important Bird Areas of New York (state)
Nature reserves in New York (state)